Frédéric "Fred" Chichin (1 May 1954 – 28 November 2007) was a French musician, singer-songwriter and multi-instrumentalist.

He was part of the pop-rock duo Les Rita Mitsouko, along with Catherine Ringer, whom he met in 1979. Prior to his work in Les Rita Mitsouko, Chichin had been active in the rock bands Fassbinder (with Jean Neplin), Taxi Girl (with Daniel Darc), and Gazoline (with Alain Kan).

Chichin died on the morning of 28 November 2007 from heart failure, following complications of the cancer the doctors had diagnosed two months earlier. He was buried 6 December 2007 in a private ceremony at the Parisian cemetery of Montmartre.

References

External links
Obituary

1954 births
2007 deaths
People from Clichy, Hauts-de-Seine
French pop singers
French male singer-songwriters
Deaths from cancer in France
Deaths from liver cancer
Burials at Montmartre Cemetery
20th-century French male singers
French multi-instrumentalists

es:Frédéric Chichin#top